This page summarises the Australia men's national soccer team fixtures and results in 2019.

Summary
Australia participated as title-holders in the 2019 AFC Asian Cup held in United Arab Emirates in January. The draw took place in Dubai on 4 May 2018. Australia qualified for the tournament after topping the group in the second round of the World Cup qualification campaign. Australia was hit by injuries ahead of the Cup with upcoming teenager Daniel Arzani and starting midfielder Aaron Mooy injured before the cup, and recently-debuted Scot-born Martin Boyle being injured in the final friendly match against Oman before the cup.

Australia's Asian Cup title defence commenced against Jordan and despite a pretence of favouritism due to being defending champions, Australia lost 1–0 after a headed goal from Jordan's Anas Bani Yaseen in the 26th minute. In their second match of the group, Australia bounced back from the loss, beating Palestine 3–0, with Jamie Maclaren scoring his first goal for Australia and Awer Mabil and Apostolos Giannou scoring too. Australia advanced from the group stage after beating Syria 3–2, with Tom Rogic scoring in injury time, following goals by Mabil and Chris Ikonomidis which put Australia in the lead. After the first two Australian goals, Syria equalized with goals by Omar Kharbin and Omar Al Somah. In the round of 16 match against Uzbekistan, neither team scored after 90 minutes of regulation time and after 30 minutes of extra-time. In the penalty shootout following the game, Australia progressed with a 4–2 score, after Mathew Ryan saved 2 penalties. In the quarter-final match against hosts United Arab Emirates, Australia were knocked-out of the Asian Cup after losing 1–0 with Ali Mabkhout scoring following a defensive error by Milos Degenek.

On 7 June 2019, Australia played an inexperienced side against South Korea in a friendly match in Busan. South Korea won 1–0 with Hwang Ui-jo scoring the only goal in the 76th minute. Australia had 4 players debuting for the senior national team, with Andrew Redmayne and Brandon O'Neill starting while Brandon Borrello and Ryan Williams were substituted on.

In September 2019, Australia commenced the qualification process for the 2022 FIFA World Cup. Australia started in the second round of AFC qualification which doubles as the second round of qualifiers for the 2023 AFC Asian Cup. The draw for the second round was held on 17 July 2019 at AFC House in Kuala Lumpur, Malaysia. Australia were placed in pot 1 and were drawn against Jordan, Kuwait, Chinese Taipei and Nepal. Australia started the qualification process with a 3–0 away win over Kuwait, with stand-in skipper Mathew Leckie scoring a brace and Mooy scoring the third goal. A month later, in their first home match of the qualification process, Australia beat Nepal 5–0, with Maclaren scoring a hat-trick and Scottish-born debutant Harry Souttar scoring a brace. 5 days later, Australia travelled to Taiwan and beat Chinese Taipei 7–1, with Adam Taggart, and Jackson Irvine scoring braces while Souttar and Maclaren scored their fourth international goals in a week.
Australia finished the year in Jordan, where they had not previously beaten the hosts. An early Adam Taggart goal was the only one of the match to leave Australia with a perfect record after 4 matches of World Cup qualifying and 4 to play in the first half of 2020.

Record

Match results

Friendlies

Asian Cup

World Cup and Asian Cup qualifiers

Player statistics
Correct as of 14 November 2019 (v. ).
Numbers are listed by player's number in Asian Cup or last match played

References

External links
 Australia: Fixtures and Results

Australia national soccer team seasons
2019 national football team results